Børge Havn (24 May 1902 – 8 May 1958) was a Danish footballer. He played in eight matches for the Denmark national football team from 1927 to 1929.

References

External links
 

1902 births
1958 deaths
Danish men's footballers
Denmark international footballers
Place of birth missing
Association footballers not categorized by position